Epsilon Boötis (ε Boötis, abbreviated Epsilon Boo, ε Boo), officially named Izar, is a binary star in the northern constellation of Boötes.

Nomenclature

ε Boötis (Latinised to Epsilon Boötis) is the star's Bayer designation.

It bore the traditional names Izar, Mirak and Mizar, and was named   by Friedrich Georg Wilhelm von Struve. In 2016, the International Astronomical Union organized a Working Group on Star Names (WGSN) to catalogue and standardize proper names for stars. The WGSN approved the name Izar for this star on 21 August 2016 and it is now so entered in the IAU Catalog of Star Names.

In Chinese astronomy,   ('Celestial Lance'), refers to an asterism consisting of Epsilon Boötis, Sigma Boötis and Rho Boötis.

Properties

The brighter component (A) has an apparent visual magnitude of 2.37, making it readily visible to the naked eye at night. The fainter component (B) is at magnitude 5.12, which by itself would also be visible to the naked eye. This means the pair has a projected separation of 185 Astronomical Units, and they orbit each other with a period of at least 1,000 years.

The brighter member has a stellar classification of K0 II-III, which means it is a fairly late-stage star well into its stellar evolution, having already exhausted its supply of hydrogen fuel at the core. With more than four times the mass of the Sun, it has expanded to about 33 times the Sun's radius and is emitting 501 times the luminosity of the Sun. This energy is being radiated from its outer envelope at an effective temperature of 4,550 K, giving it the orange hue of a K-type star.

The companion star has a classification of A2 V, so it is a main sequence star that is generating energy through the thermonuclear fusion of hydrogen at its core.

By the time the smaller main sequence star reaches the current point of the primary in its evolution, the larger star will have lost much of its mass in a planetary nebula and will have evolved into a white dwarf. The pair will have essentially changed roles: the brighter star becoming the dim dwarf, while the lesser companion will shine as a giant star.

In culture
In 1973, the Scottish astronomer and science fiction writer Duncan Lunan claimed to have managed to interpret a message caught in the 1920s by two Norwegian physicists that, according to his theory, came from a 13,000 year old satellite polar orbiting the Earth known as the Black Knight and sent there by the inhabitants of a planet orbiting Epsilon Boötis. The story was even reported in Time magazine. Lunan later withdrew his Epsilon Boötis theory, presenting proofs against it and clarifying why he was brought to formulate it in the first place, but later revoked his withdrawal.

References

External links
 Information page for HR 5506 (Izar) on VizieR
 Information page for HR 5505 (ε Boötes B) on VizieR
 Information page for CCDM J14449+2704 (all component stars) on VizieR
 Image of Epsilon Boötis
 List of constellations and named stars
 Izar star chart with viewing information on in-the-sky.org
 ε Boötes B star chart with viewing information on in-the-sky.org

Binary stars
Bootis, 36
129988 9
072105
Bootis, Epsilon
Boötes
K-type bright giants
K-type giants
A-type main-sequence stars
Izar
5505 6
BD+27 2417